Joseph Wohlfart (5 June 1920 – 5 July 2000) was a Luxembourgian politician.  A member of the Luxembourg Socialist Workers' Party (LSAP), Wohlfart held office at local, national, and supranational level.

In 1950, Wohlfart was elected to the communal council of Lorentzweiler, on which he served for over two decades, including a period as mayor (1961 – 74).  He was elected to the Chamber of Deputies in 1954.  Wohlfart sat in the Thorn Ministry as the Minister for the Interior from 1974 until 1979.  In 1988, on the death of Lydie Schmit, Wohlfart succeeded as one of Luxembourg's six Members of the European Parliament, in which capacity he served until the 1989 election.

He is the father of Georges Wohlfart, a fellow politician and government minister.

Government ministers of Luxembourg
Mayors of places in Luxembourg
Members of the Chamber of Deputies (Luxembourg)
Councillors in Lorentzweiler
Luxembourg Socialist Workers' Party politicians
1920 births
2000 deaths
People from Lorentzweiler
Luxembourg Socialist Workers' Party MEPs
MEPs for Luxembourg 1984–1989